CCTV-Storm Music is a music pay television channel of the China Central Television and it is aired throughout the People's Republic of China.

Television in China
Television channels and stations established in 2004